Luttrell can refer to:

People

 Alexander Luttrell (disambiguation), various 
 Erica Luttrell, voice-over actress
 Francis Luttrell (disambiguation), various 
 Geoffrey de Luterel (c. 1157–1218)
 Geoffrey Luttrell (1276–1345)
 Henry Luttrell, several persons
 Henry Luttrell (c. 1765–1851)
 Henry Lawes Luttrell, 2nd Earl of Carhampton (1743–1821)
 James Luttrell (c. 1751–1788), British naval officer and MP
 John Luttrell (soldier), 16th English soldier in Scotland.
 John Luttrell-Olmius, 3rd Earl of Carhampton (1741–1829),
 Narcissus Luttrell, English diarist
 Marcus Luttrell, Author, United States Navy SEAL
 Morgan Luttrell, United States Representative-elect from Texas
 Rachel Luttrell, actress
 Robert Luttrell – Lord Chancellor of Ireland from 1236 to 1246. Treasurer of St Patrick's Cathedral.  Married into the Plunkett family.
 Sidney and Alfred Luttrell (1865–1924 and 1872–1932), New Zealand architects and building contractors
 Simon Luttrell, 1st Earl of Carhampton (1713–1787)
 Thomas Luttrell (disambiguation), various including:
 Sir Thomas Luttrell (?-died 1554), Chief Justice of Common Pleas, Solicitor General

Places
 Luttrellstown Dublin, Ireland
 Luttrellstown Castle Dublin, Ireland
 Luttrell, Ohio
 Luttrell, Tennessee

Things 
 Luttrell Psalter – illuminated manuscript created circa 1325–1335